The Stults surname is the Dutch or Americanized spelling of the German surname Stultz.

Origin: Germany

Notable people with the surname 'Stults'
Eric Stults (born 1979), American baseball player
Geoff Stults (born 1977), American actor
George Stults (born 1975), American actor and fashion model
Robert Morrison Stults (1861–1933), American composer and publisher

Sources